Darleyford (meaning ford of the rock slab river) is a hamlet in the parish of Linkinhorne in Cornwall, UK.

The Darley Oak is a notable oak tree here.

References

Hamlets in Cornwall